Elk City is a city in Montgomery County, Kansas, United States, along the Elk River.  As of the 2020 census, the population of the city was 260.

History
Elk City had its start in the year 1868 by the building of a trading post at that location. The first post office in Elk City was established in November 1869.

Geography
Elk City is located at  (37.290235, -95.910244).

Demographics

2010 census
As of the census of 2010, there were 325 people, 132 households, and 91 families residing in the city. The racial makeup of the city was 93.5% White, 0.6% African American, 0.9% Native American, 0.3% Pacific Islander, 0.6% from other races, and 4.0% from two or more races. Hispanic or Latino of any race were 0.9% of the population.

There were 132 households, of which 31.8% had children under the age of 18 living with them, 54.5% were married couples living together, 10.6% had a female householder with no husband present, 3.8% had a male householder with no wife present, and 31.1% were non-families. 25.8% of all households were made up of individuals, and 15.2% had someone living alone who was 65 years of age or older. The average household size was 2.46 and the average family size was 2.89.

The median age in the city was 42.3 years. 23.7% of residents were under the age of 18; 7.1% were between the ages of 18 and 24; 21.9% were from 25 to 44; 26.7% were from 45 to 64; and 20.6% were 65 years of age or older. The gender makeup of the city was 52.0% male and 48.0% female.

2000 census
As of the census of 2000, there were 305 people, 135 households, and 83 families residing in the city. The racial makeup of the city was 94.75% White, 2.62% Native American, 0.98% from other races, and 1.64% from two or more races. Hispanic or Latino of any race were 2.30% of the population.

There were 135 households, out of which 20.7% had children under the age of 18 living with them, 51.9% were married couples living together, 6.7% had a female householder with no husband present, and 38.5% were non-families. 35.6% of all households were made up of individuals, and 23.0% had someone living alone who was 65 years of age or older. The average household size was 2.26 and the average family size was 2.93.

In the city, the population was spread out, with 21.6% under the age of 18, 8.5% from 18 to 24, 22.6% from 25 to 44, 26.2% from 45 to 64, and 21.0% who were 65 years of age or older. The median age was 44 years. For every 100 females, there were 96.8 males. For every 100 females age 18 and over, there were 92.7 males.

The median income for a household in the city was $25,000, and the median income for a family was $35,833. Males had a median income of $21,250 versus $17,708 for females. The per capita income for the city was $15,152. About 15.0% of families and 18.6% of the population were below the poverty line, including 32.8% of those under the age of eighteen and 5.8% of those 65 or over.

Education
The community is served by Independence USD 446 public school district.

Notable people
Harry Hines Woodring, 25th Governor of Kansas and 53rd United States Secretary of War

See also
 Elk City Lake and Elk City State Park

References

Further reading

External links
 Elk City - Directory of Public Officials
 Elk City map, KDOT

Cities in Kansas
Cities in Montgomery County, Kansas